The People's Republic of China developed a class of 35-ton deep-submergence rescue vehicle (DSRV) for the People's Liberation Army Navy (PLAN). It was first tested in 1986 and operational in 1989.

Six or 22 survivors could be carried. This suited contemporary PLAN submarines which deployed infrequently and typically to coastal waters.

The submarine may also perform salvage work. It has a manipulator arm and a diving chamber for six divers.

See also
Type 925 submarine support ship, used as motherships for these DSRVs.

References

Sources

Deep-submergence rescue vehicles
Submarines of the People's Liberation Army Navy
Lifeboats